Biyaheng Langit is a 2000 Filipino romantic comedy film directed by Amable Aguiluz. The film is set in a casino and stars Joyce Jimenez and Mark Anthony Fernandez. The film won six Gawad Urian Awards.

Cast
Joyce Jimenez as Bea
Mark Anthony Fernandez as Danny
Susan Africa as Koring
Christian Alvear as Tinga
John Arcilla as Berto
Nida Blanca as Amor
Vangie Labalan as Auntie
R.J. Leyran as Solomon
Bembol Roco as Bossing
Shermaine Santiago as Amanda
Onyok Velasco

External links
 

2000 films
2000s Spanish-language films
Philippine romantic comedy-drama films
2000 romantic comedy-drama films